Amar Mohile is an Indian film score composer who works predominantly in Bollywood. He is the son of composer Anil Mohile.

Selected filmography
As background score composer
{| class="wikitable sortable"
|-
! Year !! Film !! Language !! Ref
|-
| 2002||Encounter: The Killing||Hindi||
|-
| 2004||Vaastu Shastra || Hindi||
|-
| 2007||Aag || Hindi||
|-
| 2008||Homam || Telugu||
|-
| 2009||Jail||Hindi||
|-
| 2009||Acid Factory||Hindi||
|-
| 2009||Agyaat||Hindi||
|-
| 2009||Luck||Hindi||
|-
| 2009||Rann||Hindi||
|-
| 2010||Chase||Hindi||
|-
| 2010||Rann||Hindi||
|-
| 2011||Land Gold Women||English||
|-
| 2011||Money Money, More Money||Telugu||
|-
| 2011||Singham||Hindi||
|-
| 2011||Dongala Mutha||Telugu||
|-
| 2012||Hate Story||Hindi||
|-
| 2013||Zanjeer||Hindi||
|-
| 2013||Shootout at Wadala||Hindi||
|-
| 2013||3G||Hindi||
|-
| 2013||The Attacks of 26/11||Hindi||
|-
| 2013||Zila Ghaziabad||Hindi||
|-
| 2013||Table No. 21||Hindi||
|-
| 2013||1920: The Evil Returns||Hindi||
|-
| 2013||Chennai Express||Hindi||
|-
| 2014 || Anvatt || Marathi || 
|-
| 2014||Kuku Mathur Ki Jhand Ho Gayi||Hindi||
|-
| 2014||Ragini MMS 2||Hindi||
|-
| 2015||MSG: The Messenger||Hindi||
|-
| 2015 || Jazbaa || Hindi ||
|-
| 2015 || Guddu Ki Gun || Hindi || 
|-
| 2015 || Dilwale || Hindi ||
|-
| 2016 || 1920 London || Hindi ||
|-
| 2017 || Hindi Medium || Hindi ||
|-
| 2017 || Golmaal Again || Hindi ||
|-
| 2018 || Simmba || Hindi ||
|-
| 2019 || Thackeray || Hindi ||
|-
| 2019 || Amavas  || Hindi ||
|-
| 2019|| Hume Tumse Pyaar Kitna || Hindi||
|-
| 2019 || X Ray: The Inner Image || Hindi||
|-
| 2020 || Khuda Haafiz || Hindi||
|-
| 2020 || Laxmii || Hindi||
|-
| 2021 || Mumbai Saga || Hindi ||
|-
| 2021 || Bhuj: The Pride of India || Hindi ||
|-
| 2021 || Kya Meri Sonam Gupta Bewafa Hai? || Hindi ||
|-
| 2021|| Sooryavanshi || Hindi||
|-
| 2022|| Runway 34 || Hindi||
|-
| 2022|| Thank God || Hindi||
|-
| 2022|| Cirkus  || Hindi||
|}

As composer of songs.
 2004 - Ek Hasina Thi 2013 - Satya 2 2021 - Bhuj: The Pride of India''

References

External links 
 
 

Indian film score composers
Living people
Year of birth missing (living people)